Nind may refer to:

People
 Anthony Nind (1926-?), British priest
 Isaac Scott Nind (1797–1868), British colonial doctor, artist and pharmacist
 Mary Clarke Nind (1825–1905), British philanthropist
 Philip Henry Nind (1831–1896), British rower

Places
 Nind Nature Reserve, England
 Nind, Missouri, United States